Nasavrky is a town in the Pardubice Region of the Czech Republic.

It may also refer to places in the Czech Republic:

Nasavrky (Tábor District), a municipality and village in the South Bohemian Region
Nasavrky (Ústí nad Orlicí District), a municipality and village in the Pardubice Region
Nasavrky, a village and administrative part of Golčův Jeníkov in the Vysočina Region
Nasavrky, a village and administrative part of Miličín in the Central Bohemian Region